The 2014–15 NIFL Championship (known as the Belfast Telegraph Championship for sponsorship reasons) was the seventh season since its establishment after a major overhaul of the league system in Northern Ireland, and the second season that the league is being operated by the Northern Ireland Football League (NIFL), which took over from the Irish Football Association (IFA) for the 2013–14 season onwards.  The season began on 8 August 2014 and concluded on 2 May 2015.

Carrick Rangers won the Championship 1 title, winning promotion back to the top flight for the first time since their relegation in the 2011–12 season. Bangor finished as runners-up – the Promotion/relegation play-off place – and faced Warrenpoint Town from the Premiership for a place in next season's Premiership. After a 2–2 draw on aggregate after extra time, Warrenpoint Town won 3–1 on penalties and retained their Premiership status for next season. In the bottom two, Dundela and PSNI were relegated to Championship 2. Lurgan Celtic and Annagh United replaced them in Championship 1, after finishing first and second in Championship 2. For the second successive season, a club was relegated to regional football. Ballymoney United finished bottom of Championship 2 and were relegated to a regional division for the following season.

Changes from 2013–14

Competition changes
League restructure proposals to be introduced over a three-season period were approved by the NIFL on 25 June 2014. The first phase, coming into effect this season, amended the Championship rules:
 Promotion/relegation play-off – the highest ranked club with a Championship licence, finishing in positions 2–6 in Championship 1 will participate in a promotion/relegation play-off for a place in the Premiership. Prior to this season the club had to finish as runners-up to take part in the play-off.
 Championship 2 – the bottom two clubs in this season's Championship 2 will be relegated to regional football. If there are no regional champions eligible for promotion, only the bottom club will be relegated. Championship 2 will reduce in size to 14 clubs in the 2015–16 season.

Team changes
Institute won the Championship 1 title, winning promotion back to the top flight for the first time since the 2009–10 season. They were replaced by Ards, after they had finished bottom of the NIFL Premiership. In the bottom two, Limavady United and Coagh United were relegated to Championship 2. Armagh City and PSNI replaced them in Championship 1, after finishing first and second in Championship 2. For the first time since the Championship was inaugurated in 2008, a club was relegated to regional football. Killymoon Rangers finished bottom of Championship 2 and were relegated to the Ballymena & Provincial League for the following season. Mid-Ulster Football League Intermediate A side Dollingstown took their place in Championship 2, after winning the promotion play-off against Brantwood 6–4 on aggregate. Also leaving Championship 2 was Chimney Corner. In July 2014, the club announced that they would be resigning from the Championship to join the Ballymena & Provincial League for the 2014–15 season. No club replaced them in Championship 2, which meant that the division was reduced in size to 15 clubs.

Promoted from Championship 1 to the Premiership
 Institute (1st in NIFL Championship 1)

Relegated from the Premiership to Championship 1
 Ards (12th in NIFL Premiership)

Promoted from Championship 2 to Championship 1
 Armagh City (1st in Championship 2)
 PSNI (2nd in Championship 2)

Relegated from Championship 1 to Championship 2
 Coagh United (13th in Championship 1)
 Limavady United (14th in Championship 1)

Promoted from Mid-Ulster Football League to Championship 2
 Dollingstown (1st in MUFL Intermediate A Division - promoted via play-off)

Relegated from Championship 2 to Ballymena & Provincial League
 Chimney Corner (14th in Championship 2 – club resigned)
 Killymoon Rangers (16th in Championship 2)

Championship 1

Stadia and locations

League table

Results
Each team will play every other team twice (once at home, and once away) for a total of 26 games.

Championship 2

Stadia and locations

League table

Results
Each team plays every other team twice (once at home, and once away) for a total of 28 games.

References

2014-15
North
2